In materials science and engineering, the yield point is the point on a stress-strain curve that indicates the limit of elastic behavior and the beginning of plastic behavior. Below the yield point, a material will deform elastically and will return to its original shape when the applied stress is removed. Once the yield point is passed, some fraction of the deformation will be permanent and non-reversible and is known as plastic deformation.

The yield strength or yield stress is a material property and is the stress corresponding to the yield point at which the material begins to deform plastically. The yield strength is often used to determine the maximum allowable load in a mechanical component, since it represents the upper limit to forces that can be applied without producing permanent deformation. In some materials, such as aluminium, there is a gradual onset of non-linear behavior, making the precise yield point difficult to determine. In such a case, the offset yield point (or proof stress) is taken as the stress at which 0.2% plastic deformation occurs. Yielding is a gradual failure mode which is normally not catastrophic, unlike ultimate failure.

In solid mechanics, the yield point can be specified in terms of the three-dimensional principal stresses with a yield surface or a yield criterion. A variety of yield criteria have been developed for different materials.

Definition 

It is often difficult to precisely define yielding due to the wide variety of stress–strain curves exhibited by real materials. In addition, there are several possible ways to define yielding:

 True elastic limit The lowest stress at which dislocations move. This definition is rarely used since dislocations move at very low stresses, and detecting such movement is very difficult.
Proportionality limit Up to this amount of stress, stress is proportional to strain (Hooke's law), so the stress-strain graph is a straight line, and the gradient will be equal to the elastic modulus of the material.
Elastic limit (yield strength) Beyond the elastic limit, permanent deformation will occur. The elastic limit is, therefore, the lowest stress point at which permanent deformation can be measured. This requires a manual load-unload procedure, and the accuracy is critically dependent on the equipment used and operator skill. For elastomers, such as rubber, the elastic limit is much larger than the proportionality limit. Also, precise strain measurements have shown that plastic strain begins at very low stresses.
Yield point The point in the stress-strain curve at which the curve levels off and plastic deformation begins to occur.
 Offset yield point When a yield point is not easily defined on the basis of the shape of the stress-strain curve an offset yield point is arbitrarily defined. The value for this is commonly set at 0.1% or 0.2% plastic strain. The offset value is given as a subscript, e.g.,  MPa or  MPa. For most practical engineering uses,  is multiplied by a factor of safety to obtain a lower value of the offset yield point. High strength steel and aluminum alloys do not exhibit a yield point, so this offset yield point is used on these materials.
 Upper and lower yield points Some metals, such as mild steel, reach an upper yield point before dropping rapidly to a lower yield point. The material response is linear up until the upper yield point, but the lower yield point is used in structural engineering as a conservative value. If a metal is only stressed to the upper yield point, and beyond, Lüders bands can develop.

Usage in structural engineering 
Yielded structures have a lower stiffness, leading to increased deflections and decreased buckling strength. The structure will be permanently deformed when the load is removed, and may have residual stresses. Engineering metals display strain hardening, which implies that the yield stress is increased after unloading from a yield state.

Testing
Yield strength testing involves taking a small sample with a fixed cross-section area and then pulling it with a controlled, gradually increasing force until the sample changes shape or breaks. This is called a Tensile Test. Longitudinal and/or transverse strain is recorded using mechanical or optical extensometers.

Indentation hardness correlates roughly linearly with tensile strength for most steels, but measurements on one material cannot be used as a scale to measure strengths on another. Hardness testing can therefore be an economical substitute for tensile testing, as well as providing local variations in yield strength due to, e.g., welding or forming operations.  For critical situations, tension testing is often done to eliminate ambiguity. However, it is possible to obtain stress-strain curves from indentation-based procedures, provided certain conditions are met. These procedures are grouped under the term Indentation plastometry.

Strengthening mechanisms
There are several ways in which crystalline materials can be engineered to increase their yield strength. By altering dislocation density, impurity levels, grain size (in crystalline materials), the yield strength of the material can be fine-tuned. This occurs typically by introducing defects such as impurities dislocations in the material. To move this defect (plastically deforming or yielding the material), a larger stress must be applied. This thus causes a higher yield stress in the material. While many material properties depend only on the composition of the bulk material, yield strength is extremely sensitive to the materials processing as well.

These mechanisms for crystalline materials include
 Work hardening
 Solid solution strengthening
 Precipitation strengthening
 Grain boundary strengthening

Work hardening
Where deforming the material will introduce dislocations, which increases their density in the material. This increases the yield strength of the material since now more stress must be applied to move these dislocations through a crystal lattice. Dislocations can also interact with each other, becoming entangled.

The governing formula for this mechanism is:
 

Solid solution strengthening
By alloying the material, impurity atoms in low concentrations will occupy a lattice position directly below a dislocation, such as directly below an extra half plane defect. This relieves a tensile strain directly below the dislocation by filling that empty lattice space with the impurity atom.

The relationship of this mechanism goes as:
 

Particle/precipitate strengthening
Where the presence of a secondary phase will increase yield strength by blocking the motion of dislocations within the crystal. A line defect that, while moving through the matrix, will be forced against a small particle or precipitate of the material. Dislocations can move through this particle either by shearing the particle or by a process known as bowing or ringing, in which a new ring of dislocations is created around the particle.

The shearing formula goes as:
 

and the bowing/ringing formula:
 

In these formulas,  is the particle radius,  is the surface tension between the matrix and the particle,  is the distance between the particles.

Grain boundary strengthening
Where a buildup of dislocations at a grain boundary causes a repulsive force between dislocations. As grain size decreases, the surface area to volume ratio of the grain increases, allowing more buildup of dislocations at the grain edge. Since it requires a lot of energy to move dislocations to another grain, these dislocations build up along the boundary, and increase the yield stress of the material. Also known as Hall-Petch strengthening, this type of strengthening is governed by the formula:
 

where
  is the stress required to move dislocations,
  is a material constant, and
  is the grain size.

Theoretical yield strength

The theoretical yield strength of a perfect crystal is much higher than the observed stress at the initiation of plastic flow.

That experimentally measured yield strength is significantly lower than the expected theoretical value can be explained by the presence of dislocations and defects in the materials. Indeed, whiskers with perfect single crystal structure and defect-free surfaces have been shown to demonstrate yield stress approaching the theoretical value. For example, nanowhiskers of copper were shown to undergo brittle fracture at 1 GPa, a value much higher than the strength of bulk copper and approaching the theoretical value.

The theoretical yield strength can be estimated by considering the process of yield at the atomic level. In a perfect crystal, shearing results in the displacement of an entire plane of atoms by one interatomic separation distance, b, relative to the plane below. In order for the atoms to move, considerable force must be applied to overcome the lattice energy and move the atoms in the top plane over the lower atoms and into a new lattice site. The applied stress to overcome the resistance of a perfect lattice to shear is the theoretical yield strength, τmax.

The stress displacement curve of a plane of atoms varies sinusoidally as stress peaks when an atom is forced over the atom below and then falls as the atom slides into the next lattice point.

 

where  is the interatomic separation distance. Since τ = G γ and dτ/dγ = G at small strains (i.e. Single atomic distance displacements), this equation becomes:

 

For small displacement of γ=x/a, where a is the spacing of atoms on the slip plane, this can be rewritten as:

 

Giving a value of τmax equal to:

 

See also

 Specified minimum yield strength
 Ultimate tensile strength
 Yield curve (physics)
 Yield surface

References

Bibliography
 
 .
.
 Boresi, A. P., Schmidt, R. J., and Sidebottom, O. M. (1993). Advanced Mechanics of Materials, 5th edition John Wiley & Sons. 
 .
 Oberg, E., Jones, F. D., and Horton, H. L. (1984). Machinery's Handbook, 22nd edition. Industrial Press. 

 Shigley, J. E., and Mischke, C. R. (1989). Mechanical Engineering Design, 5th edition. McGraw Hill. 
 
 Engineer's Handbook

Elasticity (physics)
Mechanics
Plasticity (physics)
Solid mechanics
Deformation (mechanics)
Structural analysis